California Scheming is a 2014 American psychological thriller written and directed by Marco Weber. The film stars Gia Mantegna, Spencer Daniels, Rachel Seiferth and Devon Werkheiser.

Synopsis
In Malibu, California, Chloe (Gia Mantegna), a teenage girl, finds an injured seagull on the beach and calls for two guys to help her out with it. The guys quickly become interested in this attractive girl and seem to do whatever she asks of them. One of the guys meets another girl, and Chloe just amps up her game of seduction.

Cast
Source:
Gia Mantegna as Chloe Vandersteen
Spencer Daniels as Jason Rourke
Rachel Seiferth as Hillary
Devon Werkheiser Nick Behrle
Claudia Christian as Mom
Chad Lowe as Mr. Behrle

References

External links
 
 
 

2014 films
2014 horror films
2014 psychological thriller films
American psychological horror films
Films set in Malibu, California
2010s English-language films
2010s American films